Vitou is a Papuan language of Indonesia used mainly by older adults.

It is spoken inland from Takar village in Pantar Timur subdistrict, Sarmi Regency.

References

Languages of western New Guinea
Orya–Tor languages